Lena Amsel (27 July 1898, in Łódź – 2 November 1929, in Paris) was a dancer and actress.

Biography
She came from a Jewish manufacturer family. In 1914 she moved to Dresden, in 1915 to Berlin. At the beginning of her career, she sought contact with the greats of variety, film and theatre. In 1916 in the Café des Westerns in Berlin, she met Karl Gustav Vollmoeller and Max Reinhardt. Vollmoeller became her lover and sponsor for several years.

In 1917 she became a dancer on the stage in the conservatory (Varieté), shortly afterwards she began working in front of the camera in Vienna. In 1917/18 she played in several silent films. Most notably: Pinselputzi causes mischief and a marriage, Brush cleaning rendevouzelt, Lena's noble acquaintance, my daughter, your daughter and the road to wealth.

Although she had no dance education, Lena Amsel was kept for a few years on German and Austrian stages as a dancer. Her film career continued at the beginning of the 20s. In 1922/23 she appeared in the four episodes of The Tragedy of Love, directed by Joe May, she played alongside Emil Jannings, Mia May, Curt Goetz and Marlene Dietrich. Her last film was "The Mighty Dollar", 1923, with Eduard von Winterstein.

In her private life, the 1917-1924 ongoing affair with Vollmoeller was interrupted by three short marriages and three divorces. In 1927, Lena Amsel moved to Paris. Vollmoeller brought her into contact with well-known artists: André Derain, Georges Braque, Pablo Picasso, Ossip Zadkine, Louis Aragon, André Breton, René Crevel and Paul Éluard.

On 2 November 1929 she organized a car race with André Derain near Paris. Both drove Bugatti sports cars. Amsel's car slammed, overturned and caught fire. Lena Amsel and her friend Florence Pitron died in the accident.

Filmography
 1917: Pinselputzi causes mischief and a marriage
 1918: Brush cleaning rendevouzelt
 1918: Lena's noble acquaintance
 1918: My daughter, your daughter
 1918: The road to wealth
 1918: Lene or Lena?
 1923: Tragedy of love
 1923: The Almighty Dollar

References

1890s births
1929 deaths
Polish female dancers
Dancers from Berlin
Emigrants from Congress Poland to Germany
Polish silent film actresses
German silent film actresses
20th-century German actresses
19th-century Polish Jews
20th-century dancers
20th-century Polish actresses
People from Łódź